The Men's moguls competition at the FIS Freestyle Ski and Snowboarding World Championships 2019 was held on February 8, 2019.

Qualification
The qualification was started at 15:25. The best 18 skiers qualified for the final.

Final
The final was started at 19:30.

References

Men's moguls